Anton Panov (Macedonian: Антон Панов, ; 1906 in Dojran – 1967 in Strumica) was a  Macedonian writer. He wrote several plays in Macedonian in the period between the two world wars. His most important play is Pecalbari, played in the theatres in Skopje and Belgrade.

1906 births
1967 deaths
Macedonian writers
Yugoslav writers
20th-century male writers
People from Dojran